Dahei Mountain is located in Jinzhou District, Dalian, Liaoning province, China. Its peak is 663 metres above sea level. It belongs to the Qianshan Mountains, named after Qian Mountain in Anshan, that extends themselves from the Changbai Mountains.

It is the highest mountain in the southern Liaodong Peninsula.

References

See also
 Dalian City
 Jinzhou District
Dalian University, which campus located at the foot of the mountain.

Dalian
Mountains of Liaoning
Mountains of China